The 2020 European 10 m Events Championships were held in Wrocław, Poland, from 23 February to 1 March 2020.

Results

Men

Women

Mixed events

See also
 European Shooting Confederation
 International Shooting Sport Federation
 List of medalists at the European Shooting Championships
 List of medalists at the European Shotgun Championships

References

External links
Results book Archived

European Shooting Championships
European Shooting Championships
International sports competitions hosted by Poland
European 10 m Events Championships
Sport in Wrocław
European Shooting Championships
European Shooting Championships